William Lowe may refer to:

Sports
 William Lowe (cricketer) (1873–1945), English cricketer
 William Lowe (footballer) (1877–1957), English footballer
 William O. Lowe (1894–1949), American college football player
 William Lowe (athlete) (1901–?), Irish sprinter
 William Lowe (bowls), Scottish lawn bowls player
 Arch Lowe (William Archibald Burnside Lowe, 1875–1942), Australian rules footballer
 Kid Lowe (William McKinley Lowe, 1900–1988), American baseball player

Others
 William Drury Lowe (1802–1877), English landowner and High Sheriff of Derbyshire
 William Warren Lowe (1831–1898), Union Army officer
 William M. Lowe (1842–1882), American politician in Alabama
 William Lowe (British Army officer) (1861–1944)
 William Henry Lowe (died 1900), Scottish physician and amateur botanist
 William C. Lowe (1941–2013), IBM Executive and "Father of the IBM PC"